This was the first edition of the tournament.

Danilo Petrović and Tak Khunn Wang won the title after defeating Gong Maoxin and Zhang Ze 6–2, 4–6, [10–5] in the final.

Seeds

Draw

References
 Main Draw

ZS-Sports China International Challenger - Doubles
2016 in Chinese tennis